The Ka'a'gee Tu First Nation is a Dene First Nations band government in the Northwest Territories. The band is headquartered in the community of Kakisa, the smallest in the territory.

The Ka'a'gee Tu First Nation is a member of the Dehcho First Nations.

References

First Nations in the Northwest Territories
Dene governments